Leo Maloney may refer to:

 Leo D. Maloney (1885–1929), American film actor, director, producer and screenwriter
 Leo Maloney (footballer) (born 1937), former Australian rules footballer